Anston is a civil parish in the Metropolitan Borough of Rotherham, South Yorkshire, England.  The parish contains 18 listed buildings that are recorded in the National Heritage List for England.   Of these, one is listed at Grade I, the highest of the three grades, and the others are at Grade II, the lowest grade.  The parish contains the villages of North Anston and South Anston, and an area of countryside to the southeast.  The Chesterfield Canal runs through this area, and buildings associated with it are listed.  The other listed buildings include houses, farmhouses and farm buildings, a church, a road bridge, and two railway bridges.


Key

Buildings

References

Citations

Sources

 

Lists of listed buildings in South Yorkshire
Buildings and structures in the Metropolitan Borough of Rotherham